The 1972–73 Alpha Ethniki was the 37th season of the highest football league of Greece. The season began on 17 September 1972 and ended on 3 June 1973. Olympiacos won their 18th Greek title and their first one in six years.

The point system was: Win: 3 points - Draw: 2 points - Loss: 1 point.

League table

Results

Top scorers

External links
Greek Wikipedia
Official Greek FA Site
Greek SuperLeague official Site
SuperLeague Statistics

Alpha Ethniki seasons
Greece
1972–73 in Greek football leagues